Netrunner is a Debian-based Linux Distribution for desktop computers, laptops, netbooks and ARM-based devices. It comes in two versions, the standard Desktop version ships with a full set of pre-installed software for everyday use, and the Core version, which allows the user to build up their own system or run it on low-spec hardware.

Overview
Netrunner is only available as a 64-bit desktop operating system that uses the Calamares graphical installer. Since the August 20, 2019, release Netrunner is based on Debian Stable. It's desktop environment is based on Plasma Desktop by KDE.

Netrunner Core is a desktop version with a few essential applications. Core version also feature both Pinebook and Odroid C1 ARM images.

Default software
A default installation of Netrunner contains the following software:

 KDE Plasma Desktop
 Mozilla Firefox (including Plasma integration)
 Mozilla Thunderbird (including Plasma integration)
 VLC media player
 LibreOffice
 GIMP
 Krita
 Gwenview
 Kdenlive
 Inkscape
 Samba Mounter (easy NAS setup)
 Steam
 VirtualBox

Release history

The following is the release history for Netrunner Core and Desktop:

The following is the release history for previously Kubuntu based Netrunner versions (discontinued):

The following is the release history for the Netrunner Rolling, which has been discontinued in favor of Manjaro collaboration efforts:

References

External links 
 

2010 software
KDE